Asterechinus elegans is a species of sea urchin of the family Trigonocidaridae. Their armour is covered with spines. It is placed in the genus Asterechinus and lives in the sea. Asterechinus elegans was first scientifically described in 1942 by Ole Theodor Jensen Mortensen.

See also 
 Aspidodiadema sinuosum
 Aspidodiadema tonsum
 Asthenosoma dilatatum

References 

Trigonocidaridae
Animals described in 1942
Taxa named by Ole Theodor Jensen Mortensen